William E. Myers is a musician, bandleader, and educator from North Carolina. He and Cleveland Flowe co-founded The Monitors in 1957. The band, which plays a mix of R&B, funk, and jazz, still performs multiple shows each year in and around their home of Wilson, North Carolina.

In 2011, Myers and the Monitors played the Smithsonian Folklife Festival. The next year, Myers received the Brown-Hudson Folklore Award from the North Carolina Folklore Society, and in 2014, the North Carolina Heritage Award.

References

Musicians from North Carolina
American educators
Living people
Year of birth missing (living people)